Or "Ori" Sasson (born 18 August 1990) is a retired Israeli Olympic judoka. He won a bronze medal in the +100 kg category at the 2016 Summer Olympics and another one at the 2020 Summer Olympics. He is the second of two Israelis to win two Olympic medals.

In June 2015, representing Israel at the 2015 European Games in judo in the +100 kg category in Baku, Azerbaijan, Sasson won a silver medal for Israel in the inaugural European Games. In doing so he won the silver medal in the 2015 European Judo Championship.

Early and personal life
Sasson was born in Jerusalem, to a family of Sephardic Jewish (Kurdish-Jewish) descent. His parents are Varda and Haim Sasson. He is the younger brother of former judoka and Israel national judo team captain Alon Sasson, who, when they were children, would hit him to show him who was boss.

He resides in Netanya, Israel, and studies business administration at Ruppin Academic Center College in Hefer Valley, Israel. Sasson is a fan of basketball and basketball team Hapoel Jerusalem B.C.

In 2020, Sasson competed in the Israeli version of The Masked Singer reality singing show, hiding in full-body falafel sandwich costume, and finished third.

Judo career
Sasson started training in judo when he was eight years old. His coaches are Gil Ofer and Oren Smadja, his club is Meitav Jerusalem, and he started competing in 2005. He has worked with Noam Eyal, a sports psychologist who works for the Olympic Committee of Israel. Sasson won the Israeli judo championship at −100 kg (−220 pounds) in 2007–09 and 2011, and at +100 kg in 2011 and 2012.

In July 2009 Sasson won the gold medal at the 2009 Maccabiah Games in Tel Aviv, Israel, in judo at −100 kg.  In September 2011 he competed in the Judo World Cup in Tashkent, Uzbekistan, where Iranian Javad Mahjoub was slated to face him, but refused.

In February 2012, he won a gold medal in the World Cup Prague in judo at +100 kg. In February 2013 and the following month, Sasson won gold medals in the European Open Tbilisi, Georgia and the European Open Warsaw at −100 kg. In September 2014, he won a gold medal at the European Open Tallinn in Estonia at +100 kg, as he weighed approximately 115 kg and returned from surgery on an injured thumb.

On 26 June 2015, representing Israel at the 2015 European Games in judo in the +100 kg category (while weighing 120 kg (265 lb)) in Baku, Azerbaijan, Sasson won a silver medal for Israel in the inaugural European Games, and in doing so won the silver medal in the 2015 European Judo Championship. He lost to 159 kg (351 lb) Adam Okruashvili of Georgia in the final.

He won the silver medal at the 2016 European Judo Championships.

Rio Olympics
At the 2016 Summer Olympics, Sasson defeated Egyptian judoka Islam El Shahaby in the first round. When the match ended, Sasson tried to shake his opponent's hand, but El Shahaby refused—to loud boos and jeers from the near-capacity crowd for the Egyptian's behavior.  El Shahaby later announced that he was retiring from judo.

Sasson also beat Polish judoka Maciej Sarnacki, defeated Dutch judoka Roy Meyer, and overcame Cuban judoka Alex Garcia Mendoza. His only loss was in the semi-finals against the eventual gold medal winner French judoka Teddy Riner.

Sasson was awarded the Olympic bronze medal at Judo +100 kg.

After Rio
Sasson took part in the torch lighting ceremony at the 2017 Maccabiah Games on 6 July 2017.

On 8 October 2017, Sasson competed at the Tashkent Grand Prix, his first competition since the 2016 Olympics, and won the gold medal. On 28 October, he won the bronze medal at the 2017 Abu Dhabi Grand Slam after he defeated Benjamin Harmegnies of Belgium by waza-ari.

In 2018, he won the silver medal in the Zagreb Grand Prix. In 2019 he won the gold medal at the Tel Aviv Grand Prix, the silver medal at the Ekaterinburg Grand Slam, and the gold medal at the Budapest Grand Prix.

Sasson represents Israel at the 2020 Summer Olympics, competing at the men's +100 kg weight category. Sasson was drawn directly into the second round, where he again met Rinner, the only judoka to beat him in the last Olympics. Much like in 2016, the ten-time world champion and two-time Olympic champion Frenchman beat Sasson by a waza-ari, this time eliminating him from the individual competition.

On 31 July 2020, Sasson won his shared second bronze medal as part of the Israel national judo Mixed team.

Achievements
Source:

See also
List of select Jewish judokas
 List of Israelis
 Islam El Shehaby#2016 Olympics controversy

References

External links

 
 
 
 Or Sasson at the European Judo Union
 
  (video), baku2015.com, 27 June 2015

1990 births
Living people
Israeli male judoka
Israeli Sephardi Jews
Jewish martial artists
Jewish Israeli sportspeople
Sportspeople from Jerusalem
Maccabiah Games gold medalists for Israel
Competitors at the 2009 Maccabiah Games
European Games medalists in judo
Judoka at the 2015 European Games
European Games silver medalists for Israel
Israeli people of Kurdish-Jewish descent
Olympic bronze medalists for Israel
Olympic judoka of Israel
Judoka at the 2016 Summer Olympics
Olympic medalists in judo
Medalists at the 2016 Summer Olympics
Maccabiah Games medalists in judo
Judoka at the 2020 Summer Olympics
Israeli Mizrahi Jews
Israeli Jews
Medalists at the 2020 Summer Olympics